A burgh is an autonomous corporate entity in Scotland.

For the Etymology, or original historical meaning of the word Burgh see here. see also List of generic forms in place names in Ireland and the United Kingdom.

Burgh may also refer to:
 Burgh, Suffolk, East Anglia, England, United Kingdom
 Burgh, Netherlands
 Burgh (surname)
 Burgh (Pokémon), a character of the Pokémon universe.
 Pittsburgh, Pennsylvania, (Nicknamed by some as Da Burgh)

See also
 Burgh by Sands, Cumbria, England
 Burgh le Marsh, Lincolnshire, England
 Burgh next Aylsham village, Norfolk, England
 Burgh on Bain, Lincolnshire, England
 Baron Burgh
 Burgh Bypass
 Burgh Castle civil parish, Norfolk, England
 Burgh Castle Roman Site, at Burgh Castle, Norfolk, England
 Burgh Heath, Surrey, England
 Burgh House, London, England
 Burgh Island, Devon, England
 de Burgh
 van der Burgh
 Burh, a fortified town in Anglo-Saxon England
 Berg (disambiguation)
 Burg (disambiguation)
 Borg (disambiguation)
 Bourg (disambiguation)
 Bergh (disambiguation)
 Borgh (disambiguation)